Klavdija Koženkova ( Korniuščenko, born 22 March 1949) is a Lithuanian rower who competed for the Soviet Union in the 1976 Summer Olympics.

In 1976 she was a crew member of the Soviet boat that won the silver medal in the women's eight event.

External links
 profile

1949 births
Living people
Lithuanian female rowers
Russian female rowers
Soviet female rowers
Olympic rowers of the Soviet Union
Rowers at the 1976 Summer Olympics
Olympic silver medalists for the Soviet Union
Olympic medalists in rowing
Medalists at the 1976 Summer Olympics
European Rowing Championships medalists